"Loca" is the title of a pop song written and performed by Israeli singer Dana International. It is the second single from the album Ma La'asot.

The clip of "Loca" promoted the Gay Pride of Tel Aviv in 2013. It was presented at the main event for the Tel Aviv Gay Pride on June 7.

Lists

References

External links
 "Loca" music video

Dana International songs
2013 songs